The Spoils of War is a British television serial of 1980–1981, made by Granada Television, dealing with the return from the Second World War of the younger members of two families in the north of England. The middle-class Warringtons own a coal mine, soon to be nationalized by the first majority Labour government, while the Haywards are from the working class and are Labour supporters.

Cast

Alan Hunter as Blake Hayward
William Lucas as George Hayward 
James Bate	as Mark Warrington
Ian Hastings as Keir Hayward
Jane How as Rosalynde Warrington
David Langton as John Warrington 
Colette O'Neil	as Beth Warrington
Malcolm Tierney as Richard Warrington 
Avis Bunnage as Helen Hayward 
Anita Carey as Martha Blaze 
Malcolm Hebden as Jack Blaze
Nat Jackley as Harry Hayward 
Catherine Schell as Paula Brandt 
Madelaine Newton as Jean Hayward
Leslie Schofield as Owen Hayward
Gary Carp as Lovett Hayward
Emily Moore as Peg Warrington
John Francis Foley as Colin Hayward
William Boyde as Bill Waters
Wolf Kahler as Brandt
David Kerr as Emil Brandt
Katja Kersten as Herta Brandt
James Tomlinson as Willie Morris
Harry Markham as Moxon
Allan Surtees as Tom Poster

External links

Television shows produced by Granada Television
1980s British drama television series
1980 British television series debuts
1981 British television series endings
Television series set in the 1940s
Television shows set in England